Glyphostoma granulifera is a species of sea snail, a marine gastropod mollusk in the family Clathurellidae.

Description

Distribution
This marine species occurs along Indonesia.

References

granulifera
Gastropods described in 1913